Tardu or Tardush Yabghu was the second yabhgu of the Western Turkic Khaganate (c. 575–603), and ninth Khagan of the First Turkic Khaganate (599–603). He was the son of Istämi.

Names 
According to Lev Gumilev his personal name was Kara-Churin-Turk (Кара Чурин Тюрк). However, when he subjugated the eastern half after the death of Tulan Qaghan, he assumed the regnal name Bilge (Wise) Khagan.

Background 
The Turkic Khaganate was a vast khaganate (empire); from Manchuria and the Great Wall of China to the Black Sea. It was impossible to govern the whole khaganate from a certain capital. So while the eastern part was directly ruled by the khagan (emperor), the western part was governed by the yabghu (vassal) on behalf of the khagan. The capital of the west was Ordukent (Suyab) (present-day Kyrgyzstan). Istemi, who was the khagan's brother, was the first and Tardu (İstemi's son) was the second yabgu.

Years of civil war 
Tardu became the yabgu in c. 575. That year, he met the Byzantine ambassador Valentinius. Being a very ambitious yabgu, he was planning to seize power in the entire khaganate. He saw his chance in 581 when khagan Taspar died. Taspar had announced his preference for Talopien (son of Muqan Qaghan) instead of his son Anluo. But Göktürk kurultai (council of tribal leaders), which was authorized to appoint the new khagan, refused to follow the former khagan's will and appointed the former khagan's son, who in turn acknowledged Ishbara Qaghan as the new khagan. This gave Tardu the necessary cause to interfere. He sent an army to back Talopien. Ishbara applied to Sui China for protection and both sides were played off each other by China.

Later years 
While the east part of the khaganate suffered from civil war, Tardu was waiting for a suitable moment to realize his plans. After the Battle of the Blarathon in 591 in Sassanid Persia, Bahram Chobin who was a short-term Sasanid emperor, sought asylum in Western Turks.

In 599 Tardu declared himself to be khagan of the united khaganate (east and west) But his new status was not recognised widely. Probably to persuade the kurultai, he began a campaign against China. But unlike the Turks of the eastern part, his target of the campaign was too far away and his army suffered intensely from the poisoned water wells during the long expedition through the steppe. Finally, he had to retreat without serious combat, but this defeat was disastrous for him. After a rebellion of his subjects, he disappeared (was likely killed) in 603 or 604.

He was succeeded in the west by Niri Qaghan, a son of Talopien.

Family 
He was father to Tulu and Külüg Sibir. Sheguy and Tong Yabghu were his grandsons through Tulu.

References 

Göktürk khagans
603 deaths
6th-century monarchs in Asia
Ashina house of the Turkic Empire
6th-century Turkic people
Year of birth unknown
Year of birth uncertain